2,5-Dimethoxy-4-propylamphetamine (DOPR) is a psychedelic drug of the phenethylamine and amphetamine chemical classes. It was first synthesized by Alexander Shulgin, and was described in his book PiHKAL (Phenethylamines i Have Known And Loved). Shulgin described DOPR as a "heavy duty psychedelic", complete with alterations of the thought process and visual distortion. Very little data exists about the pharmacological properties, metabolism, and toxicity of DOPR.

The alternative structural isomer DOIP, with a 4-isopropyl substitution, is also known but is around ten times weaker than DOPR, with an active dose of some 20–30 mg (as compared to 2–5 mg for DOPR).

See also 
 DOPF
 DOx

References 

Substituted amphetamines
Designer drugs